Preço Curto... Prazo Longo (Portuguese for "Low Price... Long Time") is the second album by Brazilian alternative rock band Charlie Brown Jr. Like its predecessor, it was released through Virgin Records on March 6, 1999, and produced by Rick Bonadio and Tadeu Patolla. Totaling 25 tracks, it is Charlie Brown Jr.'s longest studio album; in an interview, vocalist Chorão explained that Preço Curto... Prazo Longo was recorded out of necessity, so the band could have more repertoire for the set list of their shows. Six of the album's tracks had previously appeared as teasers in the promotional EP Aquele Luxo!, released some months prior.

It spawned five hit singles, the first of which being "Zóio de Lula", released on April 1, 1999. "Te Levar" was used as the opening theme of the long-running soap opera Malhação from 1999 to 2006. Guest musicians include rappers Radjja de Santos, P.MC and DJ Deco Murphy (who also appeared in Transpiração Contínua Prolongada); hip hop groups De Menos Crime, Consciência Humana and Homens Crânio; and then-Raimundos vocalist Rodolfo Abrantes. Explaining its cover art in 2020, photographer Shin Shikuma stated he took inspiration from the moai statues of Easter Island, in a sense to express "awe and eternity".

The album sold over 250,000 copies, receiving a Platinum certification by Pro-Música Brasil, and in 2000 was nominated for a Multishow Brazilian Music Award, in the "Best CD" category. Following the death of Chorão in 2013, it was re-released by EMI.

In 2020, the song "Confisco" was included in the soundtrack of the video game Tony Hawk's Pro Skater 1 + 2.

Critical reception
Preço Curto... Prazo Longo received generally positive reviews upon its release. Writing for Correio da Cidadania, Leonardo Botti stated that "[I]f you're a fan of radical sports, is between 10–18 years old or simply enjoy a fun soundtrack for your days, this is the ideal CD. After all, rock 'n' roll is mainly about fun". Anderson Nascimento of Galeria Musical gave the album 3 out of 5 stars, praising its rap-inflected sonority but criticizing its length.

Track listing

Personnel
Charlie Brown Jr.
 Chorão – vocals
 Champignon – bass guitar, backing vocals, beatboxing
 Thiago Castanho – guitar
 Marcão – guitar
 Renato Pelado – drums

Additional musicians
 De Menos Crime – vocals on "União"
 Radjja de Santos – vocals on "União"
 Consciência Humana – vocals on "União"
 Homens Crânio – vocals on "União"
 DJ Deco Murphy – scratches on "Confisco", "O Preço", "12 + 1" and "Deu Entrada pra Subir!"
 P.MC – vocals on "12 + 1"
 Tadeu Patolla – guitar on "333"
 Rodolfo Abrantes – vocals on "Bons Aliados"
 Munari – electric guitar in "Depois de uma Bela Session, um Belo Sofá, Cerveja, Pizza e um Videozinho de Skate"
 Zé Mazeo – guitar in "Depois de uma Bela Session, um Belo Sofá, Cerveja, Pizza e um Videozinho de Skate"

 Production
 Rick Bonadio – production
 Tadeu Patolla – production
 Rick Bonadio, Paulo Anhaia and Lampadinha – recording
 Rick Bonadio and Paulo Anhaia – mixing
 Rick Bonadio and Rodrigo Castanho – mastering
 Paulo Anhaia and Tadeu Patolla – ProTools engineers
 Ronaldo Simolla, Sergio Panda and Ivan Dizioli – auxiliary technicians
 Edu and Flávio – roadies

Design
 Anselmo Gomes – diagramming
 Chorão – booklet illustration
 Shin Shikuma – photography
 Marcelo Rossi – concert photos, electronic editing
 Chorão, Marcelo Rossi and Shin Shikuma – graphic project

Certifications

References

1999 albums
Virgin Records albums
Albums produced by Rick Bonadio
Charlie Brown Jr. albums